Hermene Warlick Eichhorn (April 3, 1906 – October 3, 2001) was an American musician and composer. She was born in Hickory, North Carolina.

Biography
Hermene Warlick was the daughter of Jesse W. and Ethel Herman Warlick, and an organist of the fourth generation. After eight years of piano and composition study in Hickory with Alla Pearl Little (one of the first composers to achieve recognition in the state), she entered the Woman’s College of the University of North Carolina (now UNCG), where she studied piano, harmony and composition. She graduated with a Bachelor of Science in Music with a specialization in piano in 1926, and in organ in 1927.

In 1926 Hermene married George C. Eichhorn and took a job as organist at Holy Trinity Church in Greensboro, North Carolina. In 1928 she began writing a weekly column called “Music Notes” in the Greensboro Daily News. She succeeded Wade R. Brown as Choir Director at Holy Trinity in 1937.

Eichhorn was active in musical work in the state, as an officer of the Euterpe Club of Greensboro and a member of the Executive Board of the North Carolina Federation of Music Clubs. She specialized in writing for women’s voices and other choral ensembles, published works that received many performances, and won a number of awards for her compositions.

Eichhorn's works are characterized by original rhythms and harmonies, use of folk materials, and free use of early Church material. Among the most popular of her compositions were her cantatas: Mary Magdalene, published in 1944, and Son of the Highest, published in 1946, both of which were written in collaboration with poet Rose Myra Phillips, who supplied the lyrics for both works. Eichhorn also corresponded with poets James Stephens and Charles Hanson Towne, who supplied the lyrics for The Daisies and While Mary Slept, respectively.

References
Finding Aid for the Hermene Warlick Eichhorn Papers, 1920-1975 and undated The University of North Carolina at Greensboro.
Hermene Warlick Eichhorn's obituary

1906 births
2001 deaths
American organists
American women composers
University of North Carolina at Greensboro alumni
Women organists
20th-century American women musicians
20th-century American composers
20th-century organists
20th-century women composers